The 2011 Clemson Tigers football team represents Clemson University in the 2011 NCAA Division I FBS football season. The Tigers were led by head coach Dabo Swinney in his third full year and fourth overall since taking over midway through 2008 season. They played their home games at Memorial Stadium, known as "Death Valley". They were members of the Atlantic Division of the Atlantic Coast Conference.

Clemson finished the previous season 6–7, losing in the Meineke Car Care Bowl to South Florida. They began the 2011 season unranked, but after a three-game winning streak against ranked opponents in late September, rose to #8 in the AP and Coaches Poll. However, the surprise Tigers lost three of their final four regular-season contests (with two of the losses to unranked opponents); they fell back to #21 in these polls.  However, their early start was enough to clinch a spot in the 2011 ACC Championship Game.  They won that game with an unexpectedly dominant performance over Virginia Tech, 38–10.  In the process, they won their first ACC title since 1991, and with it an automatic berth in the 2012 Orange Bowl.  It was the Tigers' first-ever Bowl Championship Series berth, as well as their first major-bowl appearance since the 1982 Orange Bowl. They lost the game in historic fashion to West Virginia by a score of 70–33, setting a bowl record for points conceded in a game.

Schedule

Depth chart

Recruiting class

Game summaries

Troy

Clemson opened the season against Troy from the Sun Belt Conference. The Tigers offense had a shaky first half adapting to offensive coordinator Chad Morris's faster new spread set. They were 0-for-8 on third down conversions and had only four first downs. Sophomore quarterback Tajh Boyd had several bad throws and near interceptions as the team were booed off the field at half time.

Down 16–13 with 6:56 left in the third quarter, Clemson finally converted their first third down, tight end Dwayne Allen with a 54-yard touchdown pass from Boyd to put the Tigers ahead. On the next drive, Boyd completed all of his passes including a seven-yard touchdown pass to Jaron Brown. The scoring run continued in the fourth quarter, ending in a 43–19 rout.

Boyd finished the game 20-for-30 for 364 yards and three touchdowns in his debut as Clemson's starting quarterback. Sammy Watkins had seven catches for 81 yards while Andre Ellington rushed 18 times for 89 yards. Freshmen accounted for 266 of Clemson's 468 yards.

Wofford

In week two, Clemson faced Wofford. The inexperienced Tigers defense struggled to contain Wofford's triple-option offense throughout the game. The Terriers led 21–13 with 4:03 remaining in the second quarter, but Tajh Boyd led a six-play, 72-yard drive and a two-point conversion to tie the game before half time.

Wofford's last lead in the game came in the opening series of the second half with a field goal. Clemson scored a touchdown each in the third and fourth quarters before stopping Wofford on fourth-and-2 with 3:30 remaining in the game to hold on for a 35–27 victory.

Boyd was 18-for-29 for 261 yards and three touchdowns. Andre Ellington had 22 carries for 165 yards. His 74-yard touchdown run was the longest of his career.

Auburn

    
    
    
    
    
    
    
    
    
    

Clemson faced defending national champions #21 Auburn in week three. Auburn took a 14–0 lead in the first quarter before Tajh Boyd began finding his passing rhythm. Boyd completed 30 of 42 passes for 386 yards and four touchdowns. The game was tied 21–21 at half time, but Clemson's defense restricted Auburn to a field goal in the second half while Boyd threw two touchdown passes to earn a 38–24 win, ending a 17-game winning streak for Auburn.

Clemson's offense totaled 624 yards, its record against an SEC opponent. Fans swarmed the field at the end of the game. Coach Dabo Swinney remarked, "I couldn't think of a better place to end the streak than Death Valley, South Carolina, baby."

Florida State

    
    
    
    
    
    
    
    
    
    

Following their victory over Auburn, Clemson entered week four ranked #21. They faced Atlantic Division champions Florida State in their fourth straight home game. FSU were without injured starting quarterback E. J. Manuel. Clemson opened up a 21–10 lead by halftime, and were in control for the rest of the game.

Tajh Boyd was 23-for-37 for 344 yards and three touchdowns and had a rushing touchdown. Freshman receiver Sammy Watkins had eight catches for 141 yards and two touchdowns while Andre Ellington rushed for 72 yards.

Virginia Tech

    
    
    
    
    

For Clemson's first road game the Tigers traveled to Blacksburg for a matchup with the No. 11 Virginia Tech Hokies. The Tigers' defense turned in its best effort of the season in a 23–3 victory against the No. 11 Hokies.  The Clemson defense led by Andre Branch held the Hokies to 258 yards and no touchdowns.  Branch had three sacks and was involved in 11 tackles.  Tajh Boyd threw one touchdown to Dwayne Allen and one interception while Andre Ellington and Mike Bellamy both recorded a rushing touchdown apiece.  This win marked the first time any ACC team had ever beaten three top 25 AP opponents in a row.  It was also the second time Virginia Tech had not scored a touchdown in Lane Stadium under Frank Beamer and was the first time since 1995.

Boston College

Clemson's fifth home game of the season was against Boston College.  Clemson controlled the Eagles for the majority of the game.  Boyd scored 2 touchdowns (1 passing, 1 rushing) before being replaced by Cole Stoudt after suffering a hip injury.  Andre Ellington (rushing) and Jaron Brown (receiving) each scored a touchdown, Sammy Watkins recorded 152 receiving yards, while Chandler Catanzaro hit a career-high 5 field goals (38, 42, 28, 20, and 47 yards).  This win marked Clemson's best start since 2000.

Maryland

    
    
    
    
    
    
    
    
    
    
    
    
    
    
    
    

Tajh Boyd threw four touchdown passes, Andre Ellington rushed for a career-high 212 yards and two touchdowns for the Tigers, and freshman Sammy Watkins scored three TDs (two passing, one kick-off return) as No. 8 Clemson rallied from an 18-point deficit against Maryland to remain unbeaten with a 56–45 victory.  The defense, however, yielded 468 yards and had no answer for sophomore quarterback C.J. Brown, who ran for 162 yards and a touchdown and threw three scoring passes in his first college start.  The 18-point deficit was the second largest in Clemson University history.  Sammy Watkins also broke the school record for most all-purpose yards in a game (345 yards) held previously by Clemson great C.J. Spiller (312 yards).

North Carolina

A 35-point third quarter explosion highlighted Clemson's home win over the Tar Heels, including a 5-touchdown performance by quarterback Tajh Boyd. Defensive end Kourtnei Brown scored two defensive touchdowns, once on an interception and another on a fumble return. Boyd threw for 367 yards and rushed for one touchdown. Wide receiver DeAndre Hopkins had 157 yards receiving and a touchdown. Clemson's defense held UNC running back Giovani Bernard to 44 yards rushing, ending his five-game streak of 100 yards or more.

Georgia Tech

The Tigers suffered their first defeat of the season at the hands of the Yellow Jackets in Atlanta. Georgia Tech's triple option attack was seemingly unstoppable for the Clemson defense as Yellow Jacket quarterback Tevin Washington scampered for 176 yards on 27 carries and a touchdown. Clemson's high-powered offense never left the gates in the first half, although the Tigers made a play for a comeback in the second half with a 48-yard touchdown catch by Sammy Watkins. Following a Rashard Hall interception to the Georgia Tech 9, the Tigers looked to have a chance to rally back, but Tajh Boyd threw an interception in the end zone to Jemea Thomas on the next play. Clemson's four turnovers in the game would ultimately prove to be costly for the Tigers.

Wake Forest

Clemson clinched its second ACC Atlantic Division title in a nail-biter game against the Demon Deacons in Death Valley. The Tigers' 14–7 third quarter lead quickly deteriorated following a 50-yard Mike Campanaro punt return for Wake Forest. Demon Deacon running back Brandon Pendergrass added two more scores to put Wake Forest up 28–14. Clemson also lost Sammy Watkins for the second half following an injury on a third-quarter kick return. The Tigers, however, rallied back with two touchdown tosses from quarterback Tajh Boyd. Following a missed 47-yard field goal try by Demon Deacon kicker Jimmy Newman, the Tigers orchestrated a drive to set up a 43-yard game-winning kick by Chandler Catanzaro as time expired. With the win, Clemson secured its trip to Charlotte for the ACC Championship Game and finished undefeated at home for the first time since 1990.

North Carolina State

NC State shocked a heavily favored Clemson team in Raleigh, including a dominant 27-point second quarter performance. Wolfpack quarterback Mike Glennon threw for 253 yards and three touchdowns while Clemson quarterback Tajh Boyd, despite throwing 238 yards, threw two interceptions, no touchdowns, and was replaced in the 4th quarter by Cole Stoudt. NC State's aggressive pass rush hindered Boyd and Clemson's big play ability throughout the game, and the Tigers' four turnovers to NC State's none proved costly. The Wolfpack stymied Clemson's running game with running back Andre Ellington the team leader at only 28 yards.

South Carolina

Still reeling from the loss to NC State, the Tigers entered hostile territory in Columbia against the 12th-ranked Gamecocks. Clemson's offense again felt the heat from South Carolina's stingy defense, which held the Tigers to 153 total yards. Clemson's defense struggled as well against the Gamecocks' balanced attack and quarterback Connor Shaw, who threw for 210 yards and three touchdowns as well as rushing for 107 yards and a touchdown. The Tigers' tone for the game was set early when wide receiver Sammy Watkins dropped a sure touchdown pass early in the game. Although Clemson was able to keep the turnovers down this game, the tough Gamecock defense proved too relentless for the Tigers to open up any options on offense. The loss marked Clemson's third straight to its archrival.

ACC Championship

Although devastating losses to NC State and South Carolina had Clemson's future looking bleak for the rematch against Virginia Tech in the ACC Championship, the Tigers regained their form from earlier in the season to secure their first ACC Championship game win and their first ACC title in 20 years. Quarterback Tajh Boyd threw for 240 yards and three touchdowns, including a 53-yard strike to Sammy Watkins during the Tigers' 21-point third quarter rally. Clemson defense forced three touchdowns and kept the Hokies scoreless in the second half. The defense also held running back David Wilson, the ACC's player of the year, to only 32 yards rushing. Clemson running back Andre Ellington ran for 125 yards and one touchdown on 20 carries. With the win, Clemson solidified its first 10-win season since 1990, a spot in the Orange Bowl and its first BCS bowl bid in school history.

Orange Bowl

    
    
    
    
    
    
    
    
    
    
    
    
    
    
    
    

Clemson's best season in 20 years came to a crashing halt with arguably the worst bowl loss in school history. What at first appeared to have the makings of a high-scoring shootout between the Tigers and West Virginia turned into a shellacking on par with a video game score in the second quarter. Following Andre Ellington's fumble at the goalline and the 99-yard touchdown return by Mountaineer safety Darwin Cook, the floodgates opened for the Tigers. West Virginia quarterback Geno Smith was electrifying, and Clemson's defense did not have an answer for him as he rattled off 407 yards passing and 6 touchdowns. Although Clemson coughed the ball up four times on offense, the real story lay in the defense's inability to stop Smith and the Mountaineer offense. The result was a record in points in a bowl game for West Virginia.

Rankings

2012 NFL draft
Clemson had four players selected in the 2012 NFL draft.

References

Clemson
Clemson Tigers football seasons
Atlantic Coast Conference football champion seasons
Clemson Tigers football